Latvia participated in the Eurovision Song Contest 2001 with the song "Too Much" written by Arnis Mednis and Gustavs Terzens. The song was performed by Arnis Mednis. The Latvian broadcaster Latvijas Televīzija (LTV) organised the national final Eirodziesma 2001 in order to select the Latvian entry for the 2001 contest in Copenhagen, Denmark. Ten songs were selected to compete in the national final on 24 February 2001 where a public televote and four thematical jury groups selected "Too Much" performed by Arnis Mednis as the winner.

Latvia competed in the Eurovision Song Contest which took place on 12 May 2001. Performing during the show in position 9, Latvia placed eighteenth out of the 23 participating countries, scoring 16 points.

Background 

Prior to the 2001 contest, Latvia had participated in the Eurovision Song Contest one time since its first entry in 2000 with the song "My Star" performed by Brainstorm which placed 3rd. The Latvian national broadcaster, Latvijas Televīzija (LTV), broadcasts the event within Latvia and organises the selection process for the nation's entry. LTV has selected their entry in 2000 through the national selection show Eirodziesma, a selection procedure that was continued in order to select the Latvian entry for the 2001 contest.

Before Eurovision

Eirodziesma 2001 
Eirodziesma 2001 was the second edition of Eirodziesma, the music competition that selects Latvia's entry for the Eurovision Song Contest. The final took place at the LTV studios in Zaķusala, Riga on 24 February 2001, hosted by Horens Stalbe and Dita Torstere and broadcast on LTV1.

Competing entries
45 entries were submitted for the second edition of Eirodziesma, Eirodziesma 2001, following a submission period and a jury panel appointed by LTV evaluated the submitted songs and selected ten entries for the competition. Competing entries were presented to the public on 27 January 2001.

Final
The final took place at the LTV studios in Zaķusala, Riga. Ten acts competed and the song with the highest number of votes based on the combination of votes from four thematical jury groups (4/5) and the Latvian public (1/5), "Too Much" performed by Arnis Mednis, was declared the winner.

Promotion
To promote "Too Much" as the Latvian Eurovision entry, Arnis Mednis performed during the Lithuanian Eurovision national final "Eurovizijos" dainų konkurso nacionalinė atranka on 9 March 2001.

At Eurovision
According to Eurovision rules, all nations with the exceptions of the bottom seven countries in the 2001 contest competed in the final on 12 May 2001. On 21 November 2000, a special allocation draw was held which determined the running order and Latvia was set to perform in position 9, following the entry from Lithuania and before the entry from Croatia. Latvia finished in eighteenth place with 16 points.

The show was broadcast in Latvia on LTV1 featuring commentary by Kārlis Streips. The Latvian spokesperson, who announced the Latvian votes during the final, was Renārs Kaupers.

Voting 
Below is a breakdown of points awarded to Latvia and awarded by Latvia in the contest. The nation awarded its 12 points to Estonia in the contest.

References

2001
Countries in the Eurovision Song Contest 2001
Eurovision